The Starchild Trilogy is a series of three science fiction novels written by Frederik Pohl and Jack Williamson. In the future depicted in this series, mankind is ruled by a brutal totalitarian government known as the Plan of Man, enforced by a computerized surveillance state.

The books in the series were:
 
The Reefs of Space (1964)
Starchild (1965)
Rogue Star (1969)

An omnibus edition titled The Starchild Trilogy was first published in 1980.

Reception
Algis Budrys praised The Reefs of Space as "a most rewarding piece of science fiction . . . full of inventions [and] the constant generation of science-fiction ideas and science-fiction characters." However, he criticized its ending as "anticlimactic" and for its failure to resolve themes involving several prominent characters.

References

Book series introduced in 1964
Science fiction novel trilogies
1960s science fiction novels
Collaborative book series
Literary trilogies
Novels by Frederik Pohl
Novels by Jack Williamson